Autoroute 70 may refer to:
 Quebec Autoroute 70

See also 
 A70 roads
 List of highways numbered 70